Gavin Thompson is an Australian former professional rugby league footballer who played professionally for the Hunter Mariners.

Playing career
Thompson spent the 1997 season with the new Hunter Mariners franchise in the 1997 Telstra Premiership. He played in 12 first grade matches for the club, starting at both fullback and on the wing. During the season he scored three tries.

Thompson spent the 1998 and 1999 seasons with the Cronulla Sharks but did not play a first grade game.

References

Living people
Australian rugby league players
Hunter Mariners players
Rugby league fullbacks
Rugby league wingers
Year of birth missing (living people)
Place of birth missing (living people)